Barsa is a 2007 Malayalam novel written by Khadija Mumtaz. The story deals with the haunting and agonising questions of Sabida, a devout and educated Muslim lady, a doctor, who spent six years in a hospital in Saudi Arabia. It won critical acclaim for its forceful but humorous presentation of the restrictions under which Muslim women are forced to live and was hailed a milestone in Malayalam literature. It won many awards including the Kerala Sahitya Akademi Award (2010), Cherukad Award (2010) and K. V. Surendranath Literary Award (2008). A Kannada translation of Barsa was released by the Karavali Lekhakiyara Vachakiyara Sangha in February 2012.

External links
 Barsa at DC Books official website
 Review of the book by K. Kunhikrishnan (The Hindu)

References

2007 Indian novels
Malayalam novels
Novels set in Saudi Arabia
Kerala Sahitya Akademi Award-winning works
DC Books books
Literature by women